Richards Field was the first airport in the Kansas City metropolitan area.

The field was established in 1922 near the border between Kansas City, Missouri, and Raytown, Missouri, at the southeast corner of Blue Ridge Boulevard and Gregory Boulevard.  It was named for John Francisco Richards II, a Kansas City aviator killed in World War I.  The airport was visited by Charles Lindbergh.

In 1927, Kansas City built Kansas City Downtown Airport, which was briefly called New Richards Field and then became Kansas City Municipal Airport.  Richards' name was to be used for Richards-Gebaur Air Force Base.

After the downtown airport was built, the Raytown airport became known as Ong Field for aviator William Ong.  The airport was abandoned in 1949 and became a subdivision called Gregory Heights, with Ong Lake in the 1950s. A historical marker/plaque can be found at 9063 Gregory Blvd, Raytown, MO, marking the spot of the old airfield.

External links
Richards Field
Kansas City Public Library History 1
Kansas City Public Library History 2
Kansas City Public Library History 3

Transportation in the Kansas City metropolitan area
Defunct airports in Missouri
Buildings and structures in Jackson County, Missouri